Bora Sibinkić (born 20 June 1978) is a Serbian sprint canoer who has competed since the late first decade of the 21st century. He won two medals in the K-4 200 m event at the ICF Canoe Sprint World Championships with a gold in 2006 and a bronze in 2007.

Sibinkić was born in Novi Sad. He is member of the KK Vojvodina. He started his career at age of 10 in KK Liman, Novi Sad. His older brother Petar Sibinkić participated in Olympic Games in 1996 and 2000.

References
  "SIBINKIC Bora"
 
 

Living people
Serbian male canoeists
1978 births
ICF Canoe Sprint World Championships medalists in kayak
European champions for Serbia